Christian Streich (born 11 June 1965) is a German professional football manager and former player who is the manager of Bundesliga club SC Freiburg. On 29 December 2011, he was named manager following the release of Marcus Sorg. Because of his immediate success at the club and his enigmatic and, oftentimes, energetic personality, Streich has been called a "cult figure", a "firebrand", and a "football philosopher".

Playing career
Streich began his youth career in 1983 with Freiburger FC in the second division of Baden-Württemberg. In his first season with the club, Freiburg won the championship, but was defeated in the promotion round for the 2. Bundesliga. After a further season with FFC, Streich was transferred to the Stuttgarter Kickers in 1985. He left a little over a year later to play for SC Freiburg in the 2. Bundesliga.

After a season with SCF in which he made 22 appearances and scored 2 goals, Streich left the club and went to the second-division team FC 08 Homburg, with which he obtained the runner-up position and promotion into the top national league in 1989. In the 1989–90 season, Streich made ten appearances for Homburg. In 1991, Streich transferred back to Freiburger FC and played there until his playing career was cut short by a broken metatarsal in 1995.

Coaching career

Early career
Streich returned to SC Freiburg in 1995 as a youth trainer. With the youth squad, he won the 2006, 2009, and 2011 junior DFB Cup and the Under 19 Fußball-Bundesliga championship in 2008. After Robin Dutt was named manager of the Freiburg's first team in the summer of 2007, Streich served as a co-trainer, attending mainly to the youth squad. Under his direction, many youth players made the leap to the pros including: Dennis Aogo, Jonathan Pitroipa, Daniel Schwaab, Eke Uzoma, Ömer Toprak, and Oliver Baumann.

2011–12 season
At the beginning of the 2011–12 season, Streich became assistant coach of Freiburg's first team with the new trainer Marcus Sorg after Robin Dutt left the club to become head coach of Bayer Leverkusen. Following a poor first half of the Bundesliga season which saw Freiburg in the relegation zone, Streich became head coach on 29 December 2011 after Marcus Sorg was sacked.

Following the winter break, Freiburg played its first Bundesliga match under Christian Streich against fellow relegation battlers FC Augsburg. Freiburg won 1–0 off of an 88th-minute goal by Matthias Ginter, a player who trained under Streich at the youth levels at SCF and who was brought to the senior squad by Streich himself. The goal came off of a free-kick by the newly signed Danish defender Michael Lumb, another of Streich's own signings during his first transfer period with the club. With the victory, Streich became the first Freiburg manager to win their Bundesliga debut. Volker Finke lost his debut in 1991 while his immediate successors, Robin Dutt and Marcus Sorg, both drew in their debuts. The win also lifted Freiburg off of the bottom of the league table, passing Augsburg in the process. Despite being viewed as a club that would certainly be relegated before Streich took over, following an unbeaten streak of 9 matches, Freiburg secured their place in the Bundesliga for the upcoming season on matchday 32 with a 0–0 draw against Hannover 96. The team finished the season with a club record of a 10-match unbeaten streak before losing on the final matchday of the season to league champions Borussia Dortmund. Freiburg finished in 12th place. After the season, Streich was named Coach of the Year by Goal!, the official Bundesliga magazine.

2012–13 season

Under Streich, the 2012–13 season saw the club finish in fifth place, their best league standing since the 1994–95 season. The fifth-place finish secured a position in the 2013–14 UEFA Europa League, an accomplishment that the club had not achieved since the 2001–02 edition of the tournament. Had SC Freiburg defeated FC Schalke 04 on the final matchday of the season, Freiburg would have leapfrogged Schalke and qualified for the UEFA Champions League for the first time in the club's history. However, the 1–2 defeat to Schalke saw Schalke secure fourth place in the league and qualify for the tournament instead. During the 2012–13 season, Freiburg also advanced to the semi-finals of the DFB-Pokal for the first time in the club's history but lost to local rivals VFB Stuttgart 1–2 and missed the chance to play FC Bayern Munich in the final. Following the season, Streich was named Coach of the Season by Kicker magazine, beating out treble-winning Jupp Heynckes. Streich extended his contract at the end of the season.

2013–14 season
The third season with Streich as coach started out very unsuccessful with Freiburg remaining 16th in the Bundesliga and were eliminated in the group stage of the Europa League after finishing in third place. SC Freiburg was eliminated in round 3 of the 2013–14 DFB-Pokal by Bayer Leverkusen, however finished the Bundesliga season as 14th and therefore remaining in the league.

2014–15 season
Freiburg started the season with a 2–0 win against Eintracht Trier in the DFB-Pokal.

Only five wins in the second half of the season were not enough and the team finished 17th and therefore relegated to the 2. Bundesliga by a single point.

2015–16 season
Freiburg started the season with a 6–3 win against 1. FC Nürnberg and was able to win the 2. Bundesliga. All managerial contracts including Streich's originally expiring summer 2016 were extended in February 2016.

2016–17 season
Freiburg started the season with a 4–0 win against SV Babelsberg 03 in the DFB-Pokal.

Personal life

Streich is the son of a butcher and grew up working in his father's shop. He attributes his welcoming personality to his parents and their nature towards customers at the shop. After the abrupt end of his playing career, Streich completed his studies in German, and also studied sport and history at university; he eventually became a qualified teacher. 

Streich is known for his heavy southwestern German dialect and has been called a firebrand by many because of his energetic personality. He has two children and has described himself as "...just a normal guy, no tattoos, no piercings". Streich also cycles to the stadium on his bicycle for Freiburg's home matches, which is 12 kilometers from his neighbourhood.

Managerial record

Honours

Manager
SC Freiburg youth
Junior DFB-Pokal: 2006, 2009, 2011
Under 19 Bundesliga: 2008

SC Freiburg
2. Bundesliga: 2015–16

Individual
Goal! Official Bundesliga Magazine Coach of the Year: 2011–12
kicker Coach of the Year: 2012–13
VDV Bundesliga Coach of the Season: 2021–22
 Football Manager of the Year (Germany): 2022

References

External links

 

Living people
1965 births
People from Lörrach (district)
Sportspeople from Freiburg (region)
Association football midfielders
German footballers
German football managers
SC Freiburg players
FC 08 Homburg players
Stuttgarter Kickers players
Bundesliga players
SC Freiburg managers
Bundesliga managers
2. Bundesliga managers
Footballers from Baden-Württemberg
Freiburger FC players
West German footballers